Marvin Andrew Washington (born October 22, 1965) is a former American football defensive end who played eleven seasons in the National Football League (NFL).  Selected in the sixth round of the 1989 NFL draft, he played eight seasons for the New York Jets of which he was a starter for six.  He additionally played for the Denver Broncos and San Francisco 49ers, accumulating a total of 40.5 sacks in 155 games played during his career.  Washington played both basketball and football at the University of Idaho.

College career
Out of Kimball High School in Dallas, Texas, Washington went to the University of Texas-El Paso on a basketball scholarship. After two years, he transferred to Hinds Junior College in Mississippi, where he played football in 1987. Washington then went west to the University of Idaho in Moscow to play for head basketball coach Tim Floyd; he had recruited Washington to UTEP while an assistant coach for the Miners.

At Idaho, Washington played basketball for two seasons under head coaches Floyd and Kermit Davis and football for a season in 1988 under Keith Gilbertson. In his senior year of 1988–89, the Idaho Vandals won Big Sky conference titles in both sports and advanced to the NCAA postseason: the I-AA semifinals in football and the Division I basketball tournament.  He recorded a school record 14.5 sacks that year playing the right defensive end position.  In 2007, Washington was inducted into the Vandal Athletics Hall of Fame.

Professional career
Washington was selected in the sixth round of the 1989 NFL Draft by the New York Jets, the 151st overall pick.  He played a total of eight seasons for the Jets, the last six as a starter.  Washington recorded a career-high (and team-high) 8.5 sacks in 1992, and a career-high 71 tackles the following year.

After his time with the Jets, Washington played a season for the San Francisco 49ers, a season for the Denver Broncos (with whom he won a Super Bowl ring), and returned to the 49ers for his final year   He finished his career with 40.5 sacks, 386 tackles, and 10 forced fumbles in 155 games played, 96 of which he started.

Medical cannabis advocacy

Washington is an advocate for the medical use of cannabis and an entrepreneur in the cannabis industry.  In 2017, he was part of a lawsuit filed against Attorney General Jeff Sessions, seeking to overturn the classification of cannabis as a Schedule I drug.  Washington is a board member of Athletes for Care, a group that advocates for athletes on issues of health and safety including the use of cannabis as medicine.

In November 2021, Washington began hosting an online educational show about cannabis named 5th Quarter.  The show focuses in particular on the use of cannabis by athletes.

References

External links

 The Ghosts of the NFL (by Marvin Washington)

1965 births
Living people
American cannabis activists
American football defensive ends
American football defensive tackles
American men's basketball players
Businesspeople in the cannabis industry
Denver Broncos players
Hinds Eagles football players
Idaho Vandals football players
Idaho Vandals men's basketball players
New York Jets players
Basketball players from Dallas
Basketball players from Denver
Players of American football from Denver
Players of American football from Dallas
San Francisco 49ers players
UTEP Miners men's basketball players